Heteroscopine (HS-1) is the main component of the venom of Heterometrus laoticus. It belongs to the Scorpine toxin family. It is a polypeptide consisting of a defensin-like component on its N-terminal end and a putative potassium channel blocking component on its C-terminal end. It has antimicrobial effect on some bacteria, but not on fungi.

Sources 

Heteroscorpine (HS-1) is a component of the venom of the Thai giant scorpion Heterometrus laoticus. This species is a member of the scorpion family commonly known as giant forest scorpions, indigenous to large parts of South and South-East Asia.

Chemistry 

The gene coding for HS-1 consists of one intron flanked by two exons. HS-1 is a polypeptide consisting of 95 amino acids. The HS-1 protein has a large resemblance to other toxins of the Scorpine family (which is a subgroup of the Beta-KTx toxin family). The polypeptides of the Scorpine family possess two structural and functional domains: a N-terminal α-helix (which has a cytolytic and/or antimicrobial activity similar to that of insect defensins), and a C-terminal region with a CSαβ motif, which causes potassium channel-blocking activity. HS-1 is highly homologous in particular to the Scorpine toxin Panscorpine (from Emperor scorpion) and Opiscorpine (from Opistophthalmus carinatus), with an 80% similarity in amino acid sequence. Opiscorpine and HS-1 are both classified as scorpine-like peptides.
Based on its sequence homology with other scorpine-like peptides, HS-1 is likely to be a voltage-gated potassium channel blocker.
HS-1 also has antimicrobial effects on some bacterial species, i.e. Bacillus subtilis, Klebsiella pneumoniae and Pseudomonas aeruginosa; it has no inhibitory effects on fungi. The inhibitory effect on bacteria has no gram specificity. Scanning electron microscopy shows that HS-1 causes roughening and blebbing of bacterial cell surfaces. HS-1 contains three disulfide bridges followed by a typical Cys pattern, similar to that of invertebrate defensins. Thus, HS-1 is likely to act accordingly.

Toxicity 

Symptoms from envenomation in humans from the Heterometrus genera are reported to be of mild severity. Sting can cause redness, swelling, inflammation and pain for hours up to a few days. Injection of the purified toxin in crickets causes paralysis.

References 

Peptides
Scorpion toxins